Sarveen Choudhary (born 1966) is an Indian politician, from the northern state of Himachal Pradesh. She is an MLA from Shahpur. She is the cabinet minister in Bharatiya Janata Party ministry in Himachal Pradesh holding Urban, Town & Country Planning departments. In Dhumal Government she was minister of Social Justice and empowerment. She was elected to Himachal Pradesh Assembly from Kangra. She is elected from Shahpur Vidhansabha constituency.

She took part in Nehru Yuva Kendra and N.S.S. activities during student life; participated in folk dance competitions at National and International level; and remained best Folk Dancer, Punjab University for five years.

Active worker, R.S.S.; entered politics in the year 1992; remained Mandal Pradhan, Mahila Morcha, B.J.P., 1992–94; Member, State Executive B.J.P. since 1993; and President, Bhartiya Janata Party, Kangra district, 1995–97. Elected to State Legislative Assembly in 1998; re-elected in 2007; remained Parliamentary Secretary, 03-11-1998 to March 2003; Minister for Social Justice & Empowerment from 09-01-2008 to December 2013.

She was elected to the State Legislative Assembly for a fourth time in December 2017.

References

1966 births
State cabinet ministers of Himachal Pradesh
People from Kangra, Himachal Pradesh
Women in Himachal Pradesh politics
Living people
20th-century Indian women politicians
20th-century Indian politicians
Women state cabinet ministers of India
Himachal Pradesh MLAs 2017–2022
Bharatiya Janata Party politicians from Himachal Pradesh
21st-century Indian women politicians